The Office of the Superintendent of Financial Institutions (OSFI; , BSIF) is an independent agency of the Government of Canada reporting to the Minister of Finance created "to contribute to public confidence in the Canadian financial system". It is the sole regulator of banks, and the primary regulator of insurance companies, trust companies, loan companies and pension plans in Canada.

The current Superintendent is Peter Routledge, who was appointed in June 2021. He replaced Jeremy Rudin, who retired. The term of the appointment is seven years.

Mandate 
The Office of the Superintendent of Financial Institutions (OSFI) was created to contribute to public confidence in the Canadian financial system.

OSFI's mandate is to protect depositors, policyholders, financial institution creditors and pension plan members, while allowing financial institutions to compete and take reasonable risks.

Specifically OSFI achieves this through:

 Fostering sound risk management and governance practices: OSFI advances a regulatory framework designed to control and manage risk.

 Supervision and early intervention: OSFI supervises federally regulated financial institutions and pension plans to determine whether they are in sound financial condition and meeting regulatory and supervisory requirements. OSFI promptly advises financial institutions and pension plans if there are material deficiencies, and takes corrective measures or requires that they be taken to expeditiously address the situation.

 Environmental scanning linked to safety and soundness of financial institutions: OSFI monitors and evaluates system-wide or sectoral developments that may have a negative impact on the financial condition of federally regulated financial institutions.

 Taking a balanced approach: OSFI acts to protect the rights and interests of depositors, policyholders, financial institution creditors and pension plan beneficiaries while having due regard for the need to allow financial institutions to compete effectively and take reasonable risks.

OSFI’s legislation has due regard to the need to allow institutions to compete effectively and take reasonable risks. The legislation also recognizes that management, boards of directors and plan administrators are ultimately responsible and that financial institutions and pension plans can fail.

The Office of the Chief Actuary, an independent unit operating within OSFI, provides a range of actuarial valuation and advisory services to the Government of Canada.

Related legislation 

 Office of the Superintendent of Financial Institutions Act
 Bank Act
 Trust and Loan Companies Act
 Cooperative Credit Associations Act
 Insurance Companies Act
 Pension Benefits Standards Act, 1985 (PBSA)

History 
Late 1800s – establishment of the Office of the Superintendent of Insurance (OSI), which subsequently became the Department of Insurance (DOI). The DOI was responsible for overseeing federally licensed life insurance companies, property and casualty insurance companies, trust and loan companies and pension plans, and for providing actuarial services to the government.

1925 – the Office of the Inspector General of Banks was established in response to the Home Bank failure and was responsible for regulating Canada's chartered banks.

Early 1930s – Royal Commission on Banking and Currency reviewed banking and currency issues in the Canadian financial system.

Early 1960s – Porter Royal Commission reviewed structural and operational issues affecting the financial system and financial institutions in Canada. The Commission's report concluded the financial system was sound, but developments had moved beyond the current state of laws and regulatory practices. Porter argued the public could not be insulated from loss in dealing with public institutions and markets. The Commission called for a system that would provide for adequate disclosure and that would set high standards of self-regulation, backed by strong government supervision and powers to enforce proper practices.

1967 – the Minister of Finance introduced legislation to establish the Canada Deposit Insurance Corporation (CDIC) to ensure the safety of small deposits and bring about a gradual improvement in the minimum financial standard of deposit-taking institutions in Canada. In 1983, legislative amendments extended CDIC's mandate to include assisting to maintain public confidence and stability in the financial system.

Mid-1980s – increased international competition and the failure of two Canadian banks and the subsequent enquiry into these failures by the Honourable Willard Z. Estey highlighted the need to ensure a sound approach to handling the risks associated with the financial marketplace.

July 1987 – to ensure a coordinated approach to supervision and a modern regulatory framework for Canada's financial system, and acting on the recommendations of the Estey commission, the government proclaimed the Financial Institutions and Deposit Insurance Amendment Act and the Office of the Superintendent of Financial Institutions Act. This latter Act joined the Department of Insurance and the Office of the Inspector General of Banks to form OSFI, which was given the powers to supervise and regulate all federally regulated financial institutions.

May 1996 – Bill C-15 receives Royal Assent. This new legislation clarifies OSFI's prime responsibilities as helping to minimize losses to depositors, policy holders, and pension plan members and to maintain public confidence in the Canadian financial system. Preventing failure of financial institutions is not part of OSFI's mandate; however, promoting sound business practices helps reduce the risk that financial institutions will fail. The mandate stresses the importance of early intervention to achieve OSFI's objectives and establishes the basis for OSFI's mission, objectives, priorities and strategies.

Sources
https://www.osfi-bsif.gc.ca/swppws/default.html

See also
 Banking in Canada
 Canadian securities regulation
 Other federal agencies which regulate banking
 Canada Deposit Insurance Corporation
 Financial Consumer Agency of Canada

References

External links
 Office of the Superintendent of Financial Institutions web site

Federal departments and agencies of Canada
Financial regulation
Financial regulatory authorities of Canada
Government agencies established in 1987
Banking in Canada